The 1992 Mid-American Conference baseball tournament took place in May 1992. The top four regular season finishers met in the double-elimination tournament held at Gene Michael Field on the campus of Kent State University in Kent, Ohio. This was the fourth Mid-American Conference postseason tournament to determine a champion and first since 1983. Top seeded  won their first tournament championship to earn the conference's automatic bid to the 1992 NCAA Division I baseball tournament.

Seeding and format 
The top four finishers based on conference winning percentage only, participated in the tournament. The teams played double-elimination tournament.

Results

All-Tournament Team 
The following players were named to the All-Tournament Team.

Most Valuable Player 
Dustin Hermanson won the Tournament Most Valuable Player award. Hermanson was a pitcher for Kent State.

References 

Tournament
Mid-American Conference baseball tournament
Mid-American Conference baseball tournament
Mid-American Conference Baseball Tournament